An independence referendum was held in the Republic of Slovenia (then part of SFR Yugoslavia) on 23 December 1990. Both the ruling center-right coalition and the left-wing opposition supported the referendum and called on voters to support Slovenian independence.

The voters were asked the question: "Should the Republic of Slovenia become an independent and sovereign state?". The Slovenian parliament set a threshold for the validity of the plebiscite at 50% and one of all electors (the absolute majority).

Results
On 26 December the results of the referendum were officially proclaimed by France Bučar in the Assembly. 88.5% of eligible voters (94.8% of those participating) had voted in favour of independence, therefore exceeding the threshold. 4.0% had voted against independence, while 0.9% had cast invalid ballots, and 0.1% had returned their ballots unused. 6.5% of electors did not participate in the elections.

Bučar's announcement obliged the Slovenian authorities to declare the independence of the country within six months. On 25 June 1991 the Basic Constitutional Charter on the Sovereignty and Independence of the Republic  of Slovenia was passed and independence was declared the following day, leading to the Ten-Day War.

42,274 people could not vote, because they worked abroad or were involved in military service or military exercises, and were not counted in the calculation of results.

References

Ten-Day War
Independence referendum, 1990
Slovenia
Independence referendum, 1990
Slovenia
Independence referendum, 1990
December 1990 events in Europe